This is a list of countries by antidepressant consumption according to data published by the OECD.

OECD list 
The source for the data below is the OECD Health Statistics 2018, released by the OECD in June 2018 and updated on 8 November 2018.

The unit of measurement used by the OECD is defined daily dose (DDD), defined as "the assumed average maintenance dose per day for a drug used on its main indication in adults". The sources used by the OECD are primarily national health authorities. Definitions, sources and methodology per country is explained further in a document available on the OECD website. The OECD have not included the United States in these reviews, but if added the country would have the highest or second-highest rate.

See also 
 Antidepressant
 List of countries by suicide rate

Notes

References

External links 
 

Lists of countries

Health-related lists